Zharba Tso or Blind lake is a Panoramic Lake near Shigar Valley, Shigar, Gilgit-Baltistan region in Pakistan. Zharba Lake uses as a water reservoir for the residents of Shigar Valley. It is fed by the Indus River.

The lake is on a way of Shigar Valley. The lake is surrounded by the Indus River on one side and Shigar River to another side.

References 

Lakes of Gilgit-Baltistan
Shigar District
Reservoirs in Pakistan